Providencia Ranch, part of Providencia Land and Water Development Company property, was a piece of land in California, US. It was used as a filming location for the American Civil War battle scenes in The Birth of a Nation (1915) and other silent motion pictures. The valley was also the site for two Universal Studios west coast operations in 1914.

Early Universal Ranch (1912-1914) 
Alternative names of this filming site include Providencia flats, Nestor Ranch, Oak Ranch, Oak Crest Ranch, Universal's Old Ranch, and Universal Ranch (Providencia site) versus Universal City (Lankershim site).

Universal Film Manufacturing Company took over the west coast assets of Nestor Studios. This included a studio in Hollywood and ranch land in the San Fernando Valley. The Nestor Ranch was located on 'Providencia Land and Water Development Company' property east of the river, just below Cahuenga Peak.

Makeshift stages were set up on the 'Oak Crest Ranch' property and the production of western films began at the former 'Nestor Ranch' site in 1912. On December 6, 1912, an informal studio opening was held at the Oak Crest property The public was invited to tour the Oak Crest Ranch and watch a Bison Pictures cowboys and Indians battle.

Carl Laemmle, founder of Universal, saw the Oak Crest site as too small to consolidate all the west coast operations.  He ordered the purchase of larger property from the Lankershim Land, Water Development Co. The Lankershim site contained several tracts of land, including Taylor Ranch.

Consolidation began in 1914, with the relocation of several small buildings from the Sunset Gower Studios (former Blondeau Tavern) studio and Oak Crest Ranch property. 

The sets were destroyed and the site abandoned in 1914, but reacquired in 1915.

After the official opening of the new Lankershim Universal City site in 1915, the Providencia ranch (Oak Crest) property became known as the Universal Ranch.

The three sections of the Lankershim property were referred to as the Universal Back Ranch and contained the Universal City Zoo, cafe, horse corral and stage 2.

The Taylor ranch bordering on Lankershim Blvd. was divided by a stream. It contained the studio front lot and the backlot on the east side of the stream. The photographs of the Providencia Ranch land, "A Birds Eye View of Universal City", can be seen in the Los Angeles Image Archives. 

Universal still had control of the property as of March 1917.

Since 1950, this area has been home to Forest Lawn Memorial Park.

The Birth of a Nation (1915)
The Providencia Land and Water Development Company property was used for the battle scenes in The Birth of a Nation. Billy Bitzer illustrates the location of the battle scenes by his hand drawn map.

Lasky Ranch (1918) 
"The Famous Players - Lasky Corporation have secured the old Universal Ranch, a  tract within five minutes of Hollywood at a cost said to be $1,000,000. The site will be used for permanent sets and the first Picture will be a revival of  The Squaw Man, which Cecil B. DeMille is to direct."

Paramount  Ranch 
Paramount ranch: LA Times announced on November 20, 1927:  “With one gesture a 1,000 acre ranch is being abandoned.”

External media
 Los Angeles Public Library
November 24, 1913 Bailey, Chas. Z. Universal City
1911 Nestor Filmmakers at the Forest Lawn Site
1911 Nestor Filmmakers at the Forest Lawn Site
1911 Nestor Sunset and Gower

Motion PIcture Arts and Science – UCLA (picasa)
 Universal City 1912
 Universal City 1913

Notes
Universal Studios Historic District consists of two studio sites in the San Fernando Valley.
1912-1914, Providencia Land and Water Development Company, the site today of Forest Lawn in the Hollywood Hills.
1914  Lankershim Land and Water Development Company, the site today of Universal City.

Further reading
"Scrap it" the Old Universal – 1915 Universal Tour Brochure
 The Cowboys, Indians and zoo 1914 first assets to be moved to the new Universal City. Motion Picture World
"The Theatre of Science; a volume of progress and achievement in the motion picture industry" by Robert Grau : Page 287 – 1914 Broadway Pub. Co. New York
 The Life & Adventures of Carl Laemmle; by John Drinkwater (Carl Laemmle views Nestor ranch and names the area Universal City))
 Universal History  1912 to 1915 – "Frickr Universal Image collection" by Dennis Dickens
 Mammoth Film Plant - The Van Nuys news and The Van Nuys Call - Friday November 29, 1912
 Mammoth Bison Film Plant - Universal Ranch 1913 - immense Moving Picture Ranch -  Evening news - Saturday  February 8, 1913 - Sault Sainte Marie, Michigan

References

External links

Movie ranches
American film studios
Film production companies of the United States
History of the San Fernando Valley